Medoševac may refer to:

 Medoševac (Lazarevac)
 Medoševac (Niš)